Gera II is an electoral constituency (German: Wahlkreis) represented in the Landtag of Thuringia. It elects one member via first-past-the-post voting. Under the current constituency numbering system, it is designated as constituency 42. It covers the southern part of Gera.

Gera II was created in 1990 for the first state election. Originally named Gera-Süd, it was renamed in 1994. Since 2019, it has been represented by Wolfgang Lauerwald of Alternative for Germany (AfD).

Geography
As of the 2019 state election, Gera II covers the southern part of Gera, specifically the city districts (Ortsteile) of Alt-Taubenpreskeln, Dürrenebersdorf, Falka, Gera, Kaimberg, Langengrobsdorf, Lietzsch, Naulitz, Poris-Lengefeld, Thränitz, Weißig, Zeulsdorf, and Zschippern.

Members
The constituency was held by the Christian Democratic Union (CDU) from its creation in 1990 until 2004, during which time it was represented by Matthias Ritter (1990–1994) and Birgit Diezel (1994–2004). In 2004, it was won by Dieter Hausold of the Party of Democratic Socialism (PDS). He was re-elected as candidate for The Left in 2009 and 2014. The constituency was won by Alternative for Germany in 2019, and is represented by Wolfgang Lauerwald.

Election results

2019 election

2014 election

2009 election

2004 election

1999 election

1994 election

1990 election

Notes

References

Electoral districts in Thuringia
1994 establishments in Germany
Gera
Constituencies established in 1994